Thomas Campbell (9 February 1882 – 5 October 1924) was a South African cricketer who played in five Test matches from 1910 to 1912. He was born in Edinburgh, Scotland.

Campbell died in Natal in 1924, as a result of a railway accident.

See also
 List of Test cricketers born in non-Test playing nations

References

External links
 

1882 births
1924 deaths
Cricketers from Edinburgh
South Africa Test cricketers
South African cricketers
Gauteng cricketers
Railway accident deaths in South Africa
Wicket-keepers
British emigrants to the Colony of Natal